Sir Gingalain (Guinglain, Gingalin, Gliglois, Wigalois, etc.), also known as Le Bel Inconnu, or The Fair Unknown, is a character from Arthurian legend whose exploits are recorded in numerous versions of a popular medieval romance. His nickname differs depending on the version and language; he is known in English as Libeaus Desconus. He is the title character in Le Bel Inconnu, a poem composed by Renaut de Beaujeu sometime between the mid-1180s and 1230, and in the (destroyed) 13-century manuscript, Gliglois. It is uncertain, however, if the Gliglois of the medieval manuscript refers to Gawain's son or some other character in the "Fair Unknown" cycle.

The basic outline of the romance is similar in most sources, with slight variations in emotional emphasis according to the author. Gingalain is the son of Sir Gawain by Blanchemal, a fay that Gawain meets in the forest. Blanchemal keeps Gingalain's identity a secret from him and never tells him about his lineage. He realises his desire to be a knight after finding the body of a knight in the forest and travels to King Arthur's court to be knighted as Sir Le Bel Inconnu. A messenger comes in requesting aid for the Princess of Wales, Blonde Esmerée ("Esmerée the Fair"), who is under siege by the powerful enchanter, Mabon. Le Bel Inconnu asks for the quest and accompanies the princess's lady-in-waiting and messenger, Hélie, to the besieged city. He rescues the princess and out of gratitude, she offers herself to him in marriage.

Prior to his rescue mission, Gingalain faces several adventures. The most significant of them is his defeat of Malgier le Gris ("Malgier the Grey"), an unwanted suitor who wishes to wed Pucelle aux Blanches Mains (the "Maid of the White Hands"), mistress of Ile d'Or, and in certain versions, a fae or enchantress. The mistress however, does not wish to wed le Gris and is grateful when Gingalain rescues her from him. In gratitude (and eventually out of love), she offers her saviour marriage along with her lands. They plan to marry but Le Bel Inconnu leaves before they do in haste to complete his obligation to the Welsh princess. He later returns to pay a visit to Pucelle to apologise for his abrupt departure during his initial visit.

King Arthur holds a tournament with the intent to lure Gingalain back to court—and to steer his decision of marriage more towards the newly crowned Queen of Wales. In joining the tournament, Gingalain would have to forfeit his love for Pucelle and never see her again. He decides to join the tournament regardless of the sacrifices he would have to make. Pucelle altruistically offers to aid him with her powers; she transports him out of her castle with a horse, a squire, and armour to be able to join the tournament. Gingalain eventually marries the queen (de Beaujeu emphasises that the marriage fulfils more social than emotional purposes) and later discovers that Gawain is his father.

Gingalain appears in Thomas Malory's Le Morte d'Arthur, in which he is killed along with his brothers Sir Florence and Sir Lovell when Mordred and Agravain expose Guinevere's affair with Lancelot. The Fair Unknown motif was very popular in medieval romance; Gingalain's story is clearly related to (if not the direct source of) the tales of Gareth, Percival, and especially La Cote Mal Taile.

References

External links
The Fair Unknown motif at The Camelot Project

Arthurian characters
Knights of the Round Table